The Grand River Bostonnais flows in the municipality of Rivière-à-Pierre, in Portneuf Regional County Municipality, in the administrative region of Capitale-Nationale, in Quebec, in Canada. The surface of the river is frozen from November to April. The surrounding area is mostly mountainous and forested.

Geography 

The "little river Bostonnais" flows eastward at few kilometers on the north side, in parallel of the "Grand River Bostonnais (Portneuf), and also empties in Batiscan River.

The second head of the "Grand River Bostonnais" (Portneuf) is lake Guilbeault; it flows a further  before emptying into the Grand River Bostonnais. This discharge passes through two small lakes including "Petit lac Guilbeault" (Little Lake Guilbeault).

Toponymy 

The name "Bostonnais" means in French "people living in Boston" in the U.S. state of Massachusetts.

The name "Grand River Bostonnais" was officially registered on May 7, 1981, at the bank of place names of Commission de toponymie du Québec (Geographical Names Board of Québec)

See also 
 Batiscanie
 Batiscan River
 Rivière-à-Pierre (municipality)
 Portneuf Wildlife Reserve

References 

Rivers of Capitale-Nationale